The 1995 Australian GT Production Car Series was an Australian motor racing series for production cars. It was the first and only series to be contested under the Australian GT Production Car Series name. The series was however preceded by the 1994 Australian Super Production Car Series with the Super Production category being renamed to GT Production for 1995 and the series gaining national title status  to become the Australian GT Production Car Championship in 1996. The 1995 series was won by Jim Richards driving a Porsche 968CS and a Porsche 911 RSCS .

Schedule
The series was contested over six rounds with two races per round.

Results

References

External links
 Image of series winner Jim Richards and his Porsche 911 RSCS at Lakeside, www.autopics.com.au
 1995 Australian GT Production Car Series Highlights (video) - Rd 2 Oran Park, www.youtube.com

Australian GT Production Car Championship
GT Production Car Series
Procar Australia